Ezibeleni is a township in the Eastern Cape Province of South Africa. It was established in the 1960s and officially recognised in 1974, when black South Africans were not allowed to live, but only to work, in the white-dominated Queenstown. In order to pursue the policy of separate development, the apartheid-era government of the time dictated that, due to its location on the map and the predominant Xhosa ethnicity of its people, Ezibeleni would belong to Transkei, one of ten fragmented batustans, or homelands, scattered across South Africa. 

Ezibeleni is the largest township in the Queenstown area. Its original name was Queensdale, named after Queenstown. 
It is divided into zones (1,2,3,Chancele & Themba), with the new units; known as Kwamabuyaze (RDP houses) which is still expanding.

The majority of people resident in Ezibeleni live below the living wage according to government economic classifications. There are about 12 schools in the area, 4 lower primary, 3 senior primary, 3 lower high and 2 senior high schools. 

The township is known for being a home to some of the best local and school music choirs in the country, Siyaphakama Adult Choir and Bulelani Senior Secondary School  to name but a few. Bulelani has represented Eastern Cape in the school's music competitions many times in the last 2 decades and has won many of the South African National School's Choir Competitions.

There is a vibrant social life with many church denominations and other social activities.

However, according to Statistics South Africa, the area still has a very high unemployment rate.

Notes

References
 History of Queenstown and Surrounds
 SA Education Department

Populated places in the Enoch Mgijima Local Municipality
Townships in the Eastern Cape
1974 establishments in South Africa